Matthew Josephson (February 15, 1899 – March 13, 1978) was an American journalist and author of works on nineteenth-century French literature and American political and business history of the late 19th and early 20th centuries. Josephson popularized the term "robber baron".

Biography
He was born in Brooklyn, New York on February 15, 1899, to Jewish immigrant parents Julius and Sarah (née Kasindorf) Josephson. His father was from Iasi, Romania and his mother from Rostov-na-Donu, Russia.  Julius Josephson was a printer who became a bank president before his death in 1925. Matthew Josephson graduated from Columbia University and married Hannah Geffen in 1920. They lived in Europe in the 1920s. His wife, librarian of the American Academy of Arts and Letters and an author in her own right, worked closely with her husband on various projects throughout their careers. In 1945 she and Malcolm Cowley edited Aragon, Poet of the Resistance. Matthew and Hannah Josephson collaborated on Al Smith: Hero of the Cities in 1969. They had two sons, Eric and Carl.

Initially Josephson wrote poetry, published in Galimathias (1923), and reported for various "little magazines." He became associate editor of Broom: An International Magazine of the Arts (1922–24) and contributing editor of Transition (1928–29). Josephson was also a regular contributor to The New Republic, The Nation, The New Yorker, and the Saturday Evening Post.

Josephson's first biographies were Zola and His Time (1928) and Jean-Jacques Rousseau (1932). Influenced by Charles A. Beard and the Depression, and with only one major exception, Stendhal: or the Pursuit of Happiness (1946), Josephson changed his focus of interest from literature to economic history when he published The Robber Barons in 1934.  This was followed by more full-length works in which Josephson served as a spokesman for intellectuals of his generation who were dissatisfied with the social and political status quo.

Josephson wrote two memoirs, Life Among the Surrealists (1962) and Infidel in the Temple (1967). He died on March 13, 1978, at the Community Hospital in Santa Cruz, California.

Legacy
Josephson's collected papers are in the Yale Collection of American Literature, Beinecke Rare Book and Manuscript Library at Yale University.

Bibliography
Galimathias (1923)
Zola and His Time (1928, biography)
Portrait of the Artist as American (1930)
Jean-Jacques Rousseau (1932, biography)
Nazi Culture: The Brown Darkness Over Germany, John Day (1933)
The Robber Barons: The Great American Capitalists (1934)
The Politicos (1938, essay)
The President Makers: The Culture of Politics and Leadership in an Age of Enlightenment 1896–1919 (1940)
Victor Hugo (1942, biography)
Empire of the Air: Juan Trippe and the Struggle for World Airways (1943)
Stendhal (1946, biography)
Sidney Hillman (1952, biography)
Union House Union Bar: The History of the Hotel & Restaurant Employees and Bartenders International Union, AFL-CIO (1956, nonfiction)
Edison (1959, biography)
Life Among the Surrealists (1962, memoir)
Infidel in the Temple: a memoir of the 1930s (1967, memoir)
The Money Lords, The Great Finance Capitalists, 1925–1950 (1972, nonfiction)
Al Smith: Hero of the Cities; a Political Portrait Drawing on the Papers of Frances Perkins (1969)

References

 David E. Shi, Matthew Josephson: Bourgeois Bohemian (1981).

External links
 
 Matthew Josephson Papers. Yale Collection of American Literature, Beinecke Rare Book and Manuscript Library.

1899 births
1978 deaths
20th-century American poets
20th-century American biographers
American male biographers
20th-century American historians
American male journalists
American people of Romanian-Jewish descent
American people of Russian-Jewish descent
Jewish American historians
Journalists from New York City
20th-century American memoirists
Columbia College (New York) alumni
Historians of the United States
Members of the American Academy of Arts and Letters
Musicians from Brooklyn
20th-century American musicians
American male poets
20th-century American male writers
20th-century American Jews